Jean-Baptiste Manwangari is a Burundian born in the 50s. It is from the Kirundo Province and more precisely in Busoni commune in northern Burundi.He was a member of the Pan-African Parliament from Burundi. Manwangari is a member of the nationalist Union for National Progress party . He is also a Tutsi.Since the beginning of his political career(under the chairmanship of President Jean-Baptiste Bagaza), he is a very influential members of Union for National Progress party of which he was the chairman. Indeed, member of various governments since 1976,he was on the head of different National department, such as Justice, Interior, Transport, Post and Telecommunications, territorial administration and was a leading senior advisor to the President Pierre Buyoya for political and legal questions .It was also a long time a member of parliament as MP and Senator

References

External links
 "BURUNDI: President names cabinet, new faces abound" IRIN News, 31 August 2005

Year of birth missing (living people)
Living people
Union for National Progress politicians
Members of the Pan-African Parliament from Burundi